LibrePlanet (literally, "Free Planet") is a community project created and supported by the Free Software Foundation. Its objective is the promotion of free software around the world by bringing every year an international conference to local communities and organizations.

History
The project was born in 2006, at a gathering of members associated with the Foundation and the will to organize into geographical groups. The wiki serves as the primary portal for people who want to become involved in free software activism in local, grassroots modes of cooperation.

LibrePlanet conference
The conference is organized annually by the Free Software Foundation in or around Boston, Massachusetts and staffed by a mixture of foundation staff and community volunteers. The conference replaces and incorporates the FSF Annual Members Meeting (AMM) which ran around the same time each year.

Each conference has its own theme and a website. The event typically includes a speech from FSF president, Richard Stallman and FSF executive director John Sullivan, the Free Software awards well as members of the wider free software community and the Free Software awards ceremony

Notable events
 Edward Snowden spoke at the convention in 2016.

 LibrePlanet 2020 13-15 March: In-person components were canceled due to the ongoing COVID-19 outbreak. Instead a virtual conference and livestream was held.

 Richard Stallman announced he would be rejoining the FSF board of directors at the 2021 conference.

See also
 Libre Software Meeting
 Linux-libre

References

External links

 LibrePlanet official website and wiki

International conferences
Free software culture and documents
Computer-related events
Free Software Foundation